Alopecorhinus is an extinct genus of therocephalian therapsids.

See also

 List of therapsids

References

 The main groups of non-mammalian synapsids at Mikko's Phylogeny Archive

Scylacosaurids
Fossil taxa described in 1912
Taxa named by Robert Broom
Therocephalia genera